The Luxembourg 3. Division is the fifth tier of the Luxembourg football league system. There are a total of 11 teams in the division. Unlike the 1. Division and 2. Division, that comprise two separate series that run parallel throughout the season, the 3. Division only has a single series. The  two teams that finish first and second are automatically promoted to the 2. Division. The teams that finish third and fourth enter the single-match promotion playoffs against the teams finishing second last in both series of the 2. Division. These matches are played at the end of the regular season at the end of May/beginning of June at neutral grounds, chosen to be equally distant from both clubs home grounds. The winners of the playoff match get to play in the higher division the following season.

After the 2021-22 season, the champions AS Rupensia Lusitanos Larochette and second-placed FC Tricolore Gasperich were automatically promoted along with FC Etoile Sportive Schouweiler (3rd) and FC Olympia Christnach-Waldbillig (4th) who both won their playoff matches against FC Red Boys Aspelt and FC Beckerich respectively.

2022–23 clubs

References
3. Division Serie 1 results and standings at FLF.lu
3. Division Serie 2 results and standings at FLF.lu

5
Fifth level football leagues in Europe